Tuen Mun San Tsuen is a walled village in Lam Tei, Tuen Mun District, Hong Kong. The walled village is also called San Tsuen Wai or Tai Yuen Wai.

Administration
Tuen Mun San Tsuen is one of the 36 villages represented within the Tuen Mun Rural Committee.

History
Several villages of the Lam Tei area were established by the To Clan. Originally from Poyang, Jiangxi (other sources mention Watlam in Guangxi), the To Clan moved to Ngau Tam Mei and then to Tuen Mun Tai Tsuen. Following the increase of the clan population, the village dispersed and developed into five villages in the Lam Tei area: Nai Wai, Tsing Chuen Wai, Tuen Tsz Wai, Lam Tei Tsuen and Tuen Mun San Tsuen, which were all fortified.

See also
 Walled villages of Hong Kong

References

External links

 Delineation of area of existing village Tuen Mun San Tsuen (Tuen Mun) for election of resident representative (2019 to 2022)

Walled villages of Hong Kong
Lam Tei
Villages in Tuen Mun District, Hong Kong